Jürgen Matthäus (born 1959) is a German historian and head of the research department of the United States Holocaust Memorial Museum. He is an author and editor of multiple works on the history of World War II and the Holocaust. Matthäus was a contributor to Christopher Browning's 2004 work The Origins of the Final Solution.

Education and career
Matthäus studied history and philosophy at the University of Bochum (Germany) where he earned his PhD in 1992. His first book on nation building in Australia before the First World War came out in 1993. Afterwards, he was senior historian at the Australian Department of Justice in Sydney. Since 1994, he has worked at the United States Holocaust Memorial Museum in Washington, D.C., where he currently serves as director of the research department at the Jack, Joseph and Morton Mandel Center for Advanced Holocaust Studies. He has held several guest professorships in the USA, Australia and Germany. He is a member of the International Advisory Board of the Topography of Terror Foundation (Berlin).

Together with Frank Bajohr, Matthäus edited the political diary of Alfred Rosenberg (English and German edition).

Selected works

In English
Christopher Browning, with contribution by Jürgen Matthäus: The Origins of the Final Solution: The Evolution of Nazi Jewish Policy, September 1939 – March 1942 Lincoln: University of Nebraska Press, 2004. .

 Approaching an Auschwitz Survivor: Holocaust Testimony and its Transformations, Oxford University Press, Oxford; New York, NY 2009 (as editor of The Oxford Oral History series).
Contemporary Responses to the Holocaust, Praeger/Greenwood, 2004, . With Konrad Kwiet.

In German
 Totenkopf und Zebrakleid: ein Berliner Jude in Auschwitz / Erwin R. Tichauer. Bearb. und mit einem Nachw. vers. von Jürgen Matthäus, Metropol, Berlin 2000 (gehört zu: Bibliothek der Erinnerung; Bd. 5)
 Ausbildungsziel Judenmord? : "Weltanschauliche Erziehung" von SS, Polizei und Waffen-SS im Rahmen der "Endlösung", Fischer-Taschenbuch-Verl., Frankfurt am Main 2003
 Deutsche, Juden, Völkermord: der Holocaust als Geschichte und Gegenwart, WBG, Darmstadt 2006 (Editor with Klaus-Michael Mallmann)
 Einsatzgruppen in Polen: Darstellung und Dokumentation, Wissenschaftliche Buchgesellschaft, Stuttgart 2008,  (with Klaus-Michael Mallmann und Jochen Böhler)
 Die "Ereignismeldungen UdSSR" 1941. Dokumente der Einsatzgruppen in der Sowjetunion, Edited by Klaus-Michael Mallmann, Jürgen Matthäus und Martin Cüppers. Wissenschaftliche Buchgesellschaft, Darmstadt 2011, 
 Naziverbrechen. Täter, Taten, Bewältigungsversuche, WBG Wissenschaftliche Buchgesellschaft, Darmstadt 2013 (Editor with Martin Cüppers und Andrej Angrick)

References

External links
 
 
  (In German)

1959 births
Historians of the Holocaust
Historians of World War II
German male non-fiction writers
20th-century German historians
German expatriates in the United States
Living people